The 2023 F2000 Championship Series season will be the thirteenth season of the F2000 Championship Series. Scheduled to be held over fourteen races across seven race weekends, the season will begin on March 23 at Road Atlanta and finish on August 20 at Summit Point Motorsports Park.

Drivers

Schedule 
The schedule was announced on October 12, 2022. The championship will not return to Carolina Motorsport Park, Barber Motorsports Park and Autobahn Country Club. Also, only one round will be held at Pittsburgh International Race Complex. Instead, the championship added rounds at Road Atlanta, Lime Rock Park, Road America and New Jersey Motorsports Park.

Results

Standings

Scoring system 
Three points are awarded for pole position in each class, as well as two more points for the fastest lap per race per class.

Drivers' standings

See also 

 2023 Atlantic Championship
 2023 F1600 Championship Series

References

External links 

 

F2000 Championship Series seasons
F2000
F2000
2023 in formula racing